Lake Tyrrell (also known as Lake Tyrrell Wildlife Reserve) is a shallow, salt-crusted depression in the Mallee district of north-west Victoria, in Australia. The name 'Tyrrell' is derived from the local Wergaia word for 'sky', the Boorong Aboriginal people of the area being distinguished for their interest in star-lore. The Boorong, with their astronomical traditions, told stories connected with constellations in the night sky.

In the mid-2010s, the lake became a tourist mecca, particularly for Chinese. It is a popular location for photographers and social media users, who take snaps of the lake's mirror-like surface during winter, when ground water percolates to the surface and inflows arrive from the Avoca River/Tyrrell Creek system.
 

During dry periods, people can walk on to the lake area by using places where salt has formed a solid surface.

Location and features

It is ancient, and probably formed by sand blocking the passage of Tyrrell Creek, a distributary of the Avoca River, which feeds the lake. Evaporation results in a layer of salt crusting on the lake bed, which is harvested by Cheetham Salt in Sea Lake.

The lake environment is host to Mallee reptiles, kangaroos, emus, and the white-fronted chat, an insectivorous bird. Thousands of seagulls breed on small islands on the lake. Surrounding vegetation is made up of saltbush and samphire, which supports a range of wildlife.  To the east, the lunette contains significant Aboriginal relics.

History
Water levels subsequently dropped due to climatic changes, resulting in cycles of drying and partial refilling.

In 1838, the explorer Edward Eyre was the first non-indigenous person to document Lake Tyrrell, while searching for new grazing land.

Recreation activities
Each year, on the Queen's Birthday long weekend, the lake hosts the Mallee Rally, once part of the Australian Off Road Championship and, more recently, Australian Off Road Racing Series.

On the Sea Lake side of the lake,  from the township, is a lookout and astronomy deck, built in the late 1990s.

References

Encyclopædia Britannica entry about Lake Tyrrell.

Lakes of Victoria (Australia)
Mallee catchment
Rivers of Loddon Mallee (region)